Overcriminalization is the concept that criminalization has become excessive, meaning that an excessive number of laws and regulations deeming conduct illegal have a detrimental effect on society, particularly with respect to victimless crimes and actions which make conduct illegal without criminal intent on the part of the individual.

United States 

In 2014, the Manhattan Institute for Policy Research began to study the issue of overcriminalization, the idea that state and federal criminal codes are overly expansive and growing too quickly. At the federal level alone, Institute fellows identified over 300,000 laws and regulations whose violation can lead to prison time. The Institute asserts that this puts even well-meaning citizens in danger of prosecution for seemingly innocuous conduct. From 2014 to 2016, the Institute produced reports on the status of overcriminalization in five states (North Carolina, Michigan, South Carolina, Minnesota, and Oklahoma) and has continually added more state-specific research.

National Review has described United States Supreme Court justice Neil Gorsuch as "a sharp critic" of overcriminalization.

United Kingdom 

According to the Law Commission, the rate of introduction for new criminal offences has increased drastically since 1997, with 3,000 new offences having been added to the statute book between 1997 and 2010. The accusation of overcriminalisation has been challenged by Chalmers and Leverick.

See also
Mass incarceration

References
https://www.amazon.com/Three-Felonies-Day-Target-Innocent/dp/1594035229

Criminology